The 2022 Tomsk Oblast gubernatorial election took place on 10–11 September 2022, on common election day. Acting Governor Vladimir Mazur was elected to a full term.

Background
Sergey Zhvachkin was appointed Governor of Tomsk Oblast in 2012, when he replaced 21-year incumbent Viktor Kress in the position. Zhvachkin won his second term in 2017 election with 60.58% of the vote. Zhvachkin's "soft" style of governance heavily contrasted other heads of Russian regions, which allowed opposition to strengthen. In 2020, United Russia won only 11 seats out of 37 in the Tomsk Duma elections, while two members of Navalny's team were elected. In the 2021 Russian legislative election, United Russia won 32.70% in Tomsk Oblast, its 10th worst result nationally. On 10 May 2022, Zhvachkin asked for his resignation, Deputy Head of Presidential Office for Domestic Policy Vladimir Mazur was appointed acting Governor of Tomsk Oblast.

Due to the start of Russian special military operation in Ukraine in February 2022 and subsequent economic sanctions, the cancellation and postponement of direct gubernatorial elections was proposed. The measure was even supported by A Just Russia leader Sergey Mironov. Eventually, on 9 June Legislative Duma of Tomsk Oblast called the gubernatorial election for 11 September 2022.

Candidates
Only political parties can nominate candidates for gubernatorial election in Tomsk Oblast, self-nomination is not possible. However, candidates are not obliged to be members of the nominating party. Candidate for Governor of Tomsk Oblast should be a Russian citizen and at least 30 years old. Each candidate in order to be registered is required to collect at least 10% of signatures of members and heads of municipalities (146 signatures). Also gubernatorial candidates present 3 candidacies to the Federation Council and election winner later appoints one of the presented candidates.

Registered
 Viktor Grinev (RPPSS), lawyer, chair of RPPSS regional office
 Vladimir Mazur (United Russia), acting Governor of Tomsk Oblast, former Deputy Head of Presidential Office for Domestic Policy (2020-2022)
 Galina Nemtseva (SR-ZP), Member of Legislative Duma of Tomsk Oblast, former Member of State Duma (2016)
 Andrey Petrov (CPRF), Deputy Chairman of Duma of Tomsk, former Member of Legislative Duma of Tomsk Oblast (2011-2015)

Eliminated at convention
 Viktor Kress (United Russia), Senator of Federation Council, former Governor of Tomsk Oblast (1991-2012)
 Ivan Pushkaryov (United Russia), Member of Legislative Duma of Tomsk Oblast, general director of Tomsk Electromechanical Factory
 Viktor Rulevsky (United Russia), Member of Legislative Duma of Tomsk Oblast, Rector of TUSUR

Declined
 Aleksey Didenko (LDPR), Member of State Duma, Chairman of the Duma Committee on Regional Policy and Local Government, 2017 gubernatorial candidate

Candidates for Federation Council
Viktor Grinev (RPPSS):
Sergey Naumchik, entrepreneur
Sergey Semenyako, FSB pensioner
Larisa Shevtsova, pensioner

Vladimir Mazur (United Russia):
Mikhail Kiselyov, Member of State Duma
Viktor Kress, incumbent Senator
Andrey Makarenko, Rector of Tomsk State Pedagogical University

Galina Nemtseva (SR-ZP):
Yury Polonyankin, nonprofit executive
Aleksandr Rostovtsev, former Member of Legislative Duma of Tomsk Oblast (2016-2020), 2017 gubernatorial candidate
Marat Valeyev, Member of Legislative Duma of Tomsk Oblast

Andrey Petrov (CPRF):
Natalya Baryshnikova, Member of Legislative Duma of Tomsk Oblast, 2017 gubernatorial candidate
Vladimir Cholakhyan, Member of Duma of Tomsk
Maksim Luchshev, Member of Legislative Duma of Tomsk Oblast

Finances
All sums are in rubles.

Results

|- style="background-color:#E9E9E9;text-align:center;"
! style="text-align:left;" colspan=2| Candidate
! style="text-align:left;"| Party
! width="75"|Votes
! width="30"|%
|-
| style="background-color:;"|
| style="text-align:left;"| Vladimir Mazur (incumbent)
| style="text-align:left;"| United Russia
| 198,829
| 84.94
|-
| style="background-color:|
| style="text-align:left;"| Galina Nemtseva
| style="text-align:left;"| A Just Russia — For Truth
| 14,243
| 6.08
|-
| style="background-color:|
| style="text-align:left;"| Andrey Petrov
| style="text-align:left;"| Communist Party
| 12,438
| 5.31
|-
| style="background-color:;"|
| style="text-align:left;"| Viktor Grinev
| style="text-align:left;"| Party of Pensioners
| 4,938
| 2.11
|-
| style="text-align:left;" colspan="3"| Valid votes
| 230,448
| 98.45
|-
| style="text-align:left;" colspan="3"| Blank ballots
| 3,621
| 1.55
|- style="font-weight:bold"
| style="text-align:left;" colspan="3"| Total
| 234,069
| 100.00
|-
| style="background-color:#E9E9E9;" colspan="6"|
|-
| style="text-align:left;" colspan="3"| Turnout
| 234,069
| 30.93
|-
| style="text-align:left;" colspan="3"| Registered voters
| 756,779
| 100.00
|-
| colspan="5" style="background-color:#E9E9E9;"|
|- style="font-weight:bold"
| colspan="4" |Source:
|
|}

Incumbent Senator Viktor Kress (United Russia) was re-appointed to the Federation Council.

See also
2022 Russian gubernatorial elections

References

Tomsk Oblast
Tomsk Oblast
Politics of Tomsk Oblast